The Simalungun people are an ethnic group in North Sumatra, considered one of the Batak peoples. Simalungun people live mostly in Simalungun Regency and the surrounding areas, including the city of Pematang Siantar, an autonomous city, but previously part of Simalungun Regency.

The Simalungun live in the 'Eastern Batak' lands, bordering the lands of the Batak Toba to the south and west, and the Batak Karo to the north. The Simalungun are considered to have more in common with their Karo than Toba neighbours, both groups having migrated from Toba and Pakpak in order to participate in trade.

The Simalungun language is still spoken by many Simalungun people, in addition to Indonesian.

Traditional Simalungun life

Long before Dutch colonialism was established in North-East Sumatra, people now known collectively as Batak Timur (Eastern Batak) claimed the area as their original homeland, for example Sin Raya (Raya's peoples), Sin Silou (Silou's peoples), Sin Bandar (Bandar's peoples), and so forth. Dutch colonialism was first established in the Malay area of Deli (Medan) under "De Vide et impera" (the concept of Dutch political colonialism). The Batak Timur people were ruled by raja (kings), considered to be living gods. One by one their kingdoms capitulated to Dutch aggression and expansionism. The Dutch then gave a collective name to their new colonial area of the Eastern Batak kingdoms, that name being Simeloengoen. With the current Indonesian orthography the name Simalungun is still used today, even among Eastern Batak people themselves.

The Simalungun people were ruled by raja (kings), considered to be living gods. G.L. Tichelman (1893–1962), a Dutch researcher, described Simalungun villages as consisting of houses built parallel to rivers from wooden poles and palm leaves. Houses could accommodate a single family (rumah parsatanggaan), or as many as twelve (rumah parrumahopattanggaan) with a designated area for each family within. The head of the village lived in the 'Rumah Bolon', the village's largest, most ornate house. The Head of Village was installed by, and loyal to The King. The main village or capital of each Kingdom were called 'Pematang.'
Villagers drove out spirits from the village by holding 'Robu Tabu', days on which the village would be decorated and outsiders excluded from the village.

Villages would bathe in a communal 'tapian', with water piped through bamboo tubes for bathing. The Simalungun also used bamboo tubes for carrying water back to the village. Religious ceremonies would often be held near the Tapian. 'Parsihili' were statues used to take an illness away from a person, while 'Pasiarhon' were statues used for communing with the dead. Although villagers would support victims of house fires, it was considered unlucky to offer them shelter for fear of further fires, and instead a new house would be constructed communally as soon as possible.

It was considered inappropriate to bargain with family members, so an intermediary would be used when purchasing items from family. Courtship was arranged in the marketplace using a betel nut. Girls wishing to avoid attention would give the nut to an old man, who would look after her during market day, or would wear a hiou, to suggest unavailability.

The pounding of rice was an important activity, and the communal 'Losung', or riceblock, was used for this activity, with a hole allocated for each family to use. A new losung would be cut from a tree trunk, and on an auspicious day decorated with flowers and transported into the village accompanied by music. A boy and girl dressed in ceremonial clothes would invest the new riceblock by throwing rice over it, and the villagers would sing songs.

The birth of a child was an auspicious occasion, and the dukun (midwife/witch doctor) was appointed to drive off spirits, and to cut the umbilical cord with a bamboo knife. The newborn baby would be swaddled and daubed with rice chewed by the dukun prior to the mother commencing breastfeeding. The placenta would be buried under the house and for seven nights a fire would be maintained to drive off spirits.

On the seventh day the child would be brought to the tapian. If the date of birth was an auspicious one, this would be done using by the mother a new hiou, a ragi idup or ragi panei, but if the date was a bad one, the baby would be carefully brought by all the women of the village, who would set out to deceive the evil spirits in order to protect the baby. When the child was named, it would be given black, white and red bracelets for protective purposes.

A well-preserved traditional Simalungun village can be seen at Pematang Purba.

Simalungun people

The concept of a cohesive Simalungun people is derived in part from Dutch colonialism. In 1870 the Dutch established the Residency of East Sumatra, centred on Medan in the Kingdom of Deli. In 1904 the Netherlands East Indies government signed surrender agreements with the seven kingdoms of the 'Simeloengoenlanden', in order to form the administrative of unit Simeloengoen en Karolanden. These seven Simalungun kingdoms were the kingdoms of Siantar, Tanoh Jawa, Panei, Dolok Silou, Raya, Purba and Silimahuta. It has been suggested that Tanoh Jawa had more in common with early pagan Asahan (later to become the Asahan Sultanate) than it did with the other Simalungun kingdoms.

The colonial seat was established in 1908 at Pematang Siantar. The Dutch colonial system encouraged migration, especially of Javanese and Tobanese labourers working on Dutch plantations, with both peoples bringing new influences to the area, which tended to cause the original people of Simalungun to be intimidated and marginalized. After World War II, in 1946, a social revolution occurred in East Sumatra which is viewed as a tragedy by the Simalungun people. Non-native settlers in East Sumatra demanded changes to the monarchy systems of Deli, Karo and Simalungun, and agitated for unity with the Javanese government which had been proclaimed as the Republic Of Indonesia in August, 1945. Many were kidnapped and killed, especially from the royal families of each Kingdom. The monarchy system in East Sumatra was deposed and, while the families are still intact and acknowledged by the Simalungun people as such among themselves, the titles are now entirely ceremonial within the Simalungun cultures.

Christianity

, a German missionary arrived in Sumatra in 1902. He was subject to Ludwig Ingwer Nommensen, who instructed him to head to the Simalungun region. They arrived on 2 September 1903, a day now commemorated by the Simalungun church. Theis opened several schools, and returned to the Netherlands in 1921.

The first translation of The Bible into an indigenous Indonesian language was by Wismar Djaulung Saragih Sumbayak, who had been baptised by Theis in 1910. Wismar also authored the first Simalungun dictionary, and successfully campaigned for teaching in schools to be conducted in Simalungun rather than Toba. He also pushed for the use of traditional Simalungun clothes and music in the church. His efforts eventually led to the formation of the distinct Simalungun Protestant Christian Church.

Language 
Simalungun has its own regional language that is different from Indonesian, Karo Batak, Toba Batak and Malay and is called Batak Simalungun language.

Simalungun surnames

Simalungun people belong to one of four surnames (clans). Each surname has sub-surnames, although individuals may choose to identify primarily by their surnames, rather than sub-surnames, in order to emphasize common kinship.

The four original surnames are:-
Saragih
Damanik
Purba
Sinaga

Notable people
 Saktiawan Sinaga
 Bill Saragih

References

Further reading
 
 

Ethnic groups in Indonesia
Ethnic groups in Sumatra
History of Sumatra
Batak
Batak ethnic groups
Indonesian Lutherans